The 1987 Amstel Gold Race was the 22nd edition of the annual road bicycle race "Amstel Gold Race", held on Sunday 25 April 1987 in the Dutch province of Limburg. The race stretched 242 kilometres, with the start in Heerlen and the finish in Meerssen. There were a total of 163 competitors, with 70 cyclists finishing the race.

Result

External links
Results

Amstel Gold Race
April 1987 sports events in Europe
1987 in road cycling
1987 in Dutch sport
1987 Super Prestige Pernod International